Pau de arara  is a torture method in which the victim is bound by the ankles and wrists, with the biceps under a pole and knees over it. The pau de arara torture method was widely used by during the military dictatorship in Brazil.

Name 
Pau de arara is a Portuguese term that literally translates to "macaw's perch." The term originates from the habit of tying birds to a pole for sale, where they also hang for transportation.

Torture technique 
Pau de arara is a physical torture technique designed to cause severe joint and muscle pain, as well as headaches and psychological trauma. The technique consists of a tube, bar, or pole placed over the victim's biceps and behind the knees while tying both the victim's ankles and wrists together. The entire assembly is suspended between two metal platforms forming what looks like a bird's perch.

This technique is believed to originate from Portuguese slave traders, which used Pau de Arara as a form of punishment for disobedient slaves. Its use has been more recently widespread by the agents of the political police of the Brazilian military dictatorship against political dissidents in the 1960s and 1970s and is still believed to be in use by Brazilian police forces, although outlawed.
This torture technique was also used in Auschwitz during World War II, where it was known as the Bogerschaukel (the Boger's seesaw), named after the SS officer who first applied it, Wilhelm Boger.
The device is commonly used as a platform for application of electroshock torture.  This is achieved using an adjustable voltage source that is typically wired to the victim's fingers, toes, tongue, and genitals.  The device is also often used as a restraint for a combination of other torture techniques, such as water boarding, tearing out the toenails and fingernails, and branding, as well as miscellaneous sexual abuses. Brazil former president Jair Bolsonaro has cited his support for the technique, saying "the pau-de-arara works. I’m in favor of torture, you know that. And the people are in favor as well."

Pau de arara: la violence militaire au Brésil 
François Maspero published Pau de arara: la violence militaire au Brésil in France in 1971. The book, which discussed military violence in Brazil, was banned in Brazil during the military dictatorship. It was first published in Brazil in 2013.

References 

Trucks
Modern instruments of torture
Contemporary instruments of torture
European instruments of torture